The 2014 All-Pac-12 Conference football team consists of American football players chosen by various organizations for All-Pac-12 Conference teams for the 2014 Pac-12 Conference football season. The Oregon Ducks won the conference, defeating the Arizona Wildcats 51 to 13 in the Pac-12 Championship game. Oregon was then the national runner-up, in the College Football Playoff semifinal beating the ACC champion Florida States Seminoles 59 to 20; then losing to the Big Ten champion Ohio State Buckeyes 42 to 20 in the national championship game. Oregon quarterback Marcus Mariota won the Heisman Trophy and was voted Pac-12 Offensive Player of the Year. Arizona linebacker Scooby Wright III was voted Pat Tillman Pac-12 Defensive Player of the Year.

Offensive selections

Quarterbacks
Marcus Mariota, Oregon (Coaches-1)
Brett Hundley, UCLA (Coaches-2)

Running backs
Javorius Allen, USC (Coaches-1)
Devontae Booker, Utah (Coaches-1)
Royce Freeman, Oregon (Coaches-2)
D. J. Foster, Arizona St. (Coaches-2)

Wide receivers
Nelson Agholor, USC (Coaches-1)
Jaelen Strong, Arizona St. (Coaches-1)
Nelson Spruce, Colorado (Coaches-2)
Vince Mayle, Washington St. (Coaches-2)

Tight ends
Pharoah Brown, Oregon (Coaches-1)
Austin Hooper, Stanford (Coaches-2)

Tackles
Jake Fisher, Oregon (Coaches-1)
Andrus Peat, Stanford (Coaches-1)
Kyle Murphy, Stanford (Coaches-2)
Jeremiah Poutasi, Utah (Coaches-2)

Guards
Max Tuerk, USC (Coaches-1)
Jamil Douglas, Arizona St. (Coaches-1)
Steven Gurrola, Arizona (Coaches-2)
Nick Kelly, Arizona St. (Coaches-2)

Centers
Hroniss Grasu, Oregon (Coaches-1)
Jake Brendel, UCLA (Coaches-2)

Defensive selections

Ends
Henry Anderson, Stanford (Coaches-1)
Leonard Williams, USC (Coaches-1)
Nate Orchard, Utah (Coaches-1)
DeForest Buckner, Oregon (Coaches-2)
Owa Odighizuwa, UCLA (Coaches-2)
Dylan Wynn, Oregon St. (Coaches-2)

Tackles
Danny Shelton, Washington (Coaches-1)
Kenny Clark, UCLA (Coaches-2)

Linebackers
Scooby Wright III, Arizona (Coaches-1)
Hau'oli Kikaha, Washington (Coaches-1)
Shaq Thompson, Washington (Coaches-1)
Myles Jack, UCLA (Coaches-2)
Eric Kendricks, UCLA (Coaches-2)
A. J. Tarpley, Stanford (Coaches-2)

Cornerbacks
Ifo Ekpre-Olomu, Oregon (Coaches-1)
Ishmael Adams, UCLA (Coaches-1)
Fabian Moreau, UCLA (Coaches-2)
Steven Nelson, Oregon St. (Coaches-2)
Troy Hill, Oregon (Coaches-2)

Safeties
Su'a Cravens, USC (Coaches-1)
Damarious Randall, Arizona St. (Coaches-1)
Jordan Richards, Stanford (Coaches-1)
Anthony Jefferson, UCLA (Coaches-1)
Erick Dargan, Oregon (Coaches-2)

Special teams

Placekickers
Andy Phillips, Utah (Coaches-1)
Zane Gonzales, Arizona St. (Coaches-2)

Punters
Tom Hackett, Utah (Coaches-1)
Drew Riggleman, Arizona (Coaches-2)

Return specialists 
Kaelin Clay, Utah (Coaches-1)
Ty Montgomery, Stanford (Coaches-2)

Special teams player
Shaq Thompson, Washington (Coaches-1)
Charles Nelson, Oregon (Coaches-2)
JuJu Smith, USC (Coaches-2)

Key

Coaches = selected by the Pac-12 coaches

See also
2014 College Football All-America Team

References

All-Pac-12 Conference Football Team
All-Pac-12 Conference football teams